Pleugriffet is a commune in the Morbihan department of Brittany in north-western France. Inhabitants of Pleugriffet are called in French Pleugriffetois.

Population

Geography

The village belongs to upper Brittany. The commune is border by river Oust to the east. Apart from the village centre there are many hamlets in the commune.

Map

History

From 1954, the present church was rebuilt following the plans of the architect Caubert. The church was consecrated on August 12, 1956 by bishop Eugène Le Bellec. It is a Neo-Byzantine style concrete building. It was built on the site of the old Romanesque church that it replaces.

thumb|center|The old Romanesque church, now demolished.

Gallery

See also
Communes of the Morbihan department

References

External links

 Mayors of Morbihan Association 

Communes of Morbihan